Fadogia is a genus of flowering plants in the family Rubiaceae. The genera Rytigynia and Fadogia  form a strongly supported clade but neither of these genera is monophyletic.

Distribution
Fadogia is found in Tropical Africa. F. cienkowskii and F. tetraquetra have the largest distribution and occur from Guinea to the Transvaal province. F. ancylantha and F. erythrophloea are also found in many African countries, but they don't occur so far south. The countries with the highest number of species are Angola, Democratic Republic of the Congo, Zambia, Tanzania, and Central African Republic.

Bacterial leaf symbiosis
Endophytic bacteria are housed in the intercellular space of the leaf mesophyll tissue. The presence of these bacteria can only be microscopically ascertained. The bacteria are identified as Burkholderia, which is a genus that is also found in the leaves of other Rubiaceae species. The hypothesis is that these endophytic bacteria provide chemical protection against insect herbivory.

Gousiekte
Fadogia homblei is known to cause gousiekte, a cardiotoxicosis of ruminants characterised by heart failure four to eight weeks after ingestion of certain rubiaceous plants.

Species

 Fadogia ancylantha Schweinf.
 Fadogia andersonii Robyns
 Fadogia arenicola K.Schum. & K.Krause
 Fadogia audruana M.Fay, J.-P.Lebrun & Stork
 Fadogia butayei De Wild.
 Fadogia caespitosa Robyns
 Fadogia chlorantha K.Schum.
 Fadogia chrysantha K.Schum.
 Fadogia cienkowskii Schweinf.
 Fadogia cinerascens Robyns
 Fadogia elskensii De Wild.
 Fadogia erythrophloea (K.Schum. & K.Krause) Hutch. & Dalziel
 Fadogia fragrans Robyns
 Fadogia fuchsioides Schweinf. ex Oliv.
 Fadogia glaberrima Welw. ex Hiern
 Fadogia gossweileri Robyns
 Fadogia graminea Wernham
 Fadogia homblei Robyns
 Fadogia lactiflora Welw. ex Hiern
 Fadogia latifolia A.Chev. ex Robyns
 Fadogia leucophloea Schweinf. ex Hiern
 Fadogia luangwae Verdc.
 Fadogia oblongolanceolata Robyns
 Fadogia obscura A.Chev. ex Robyns
 Fadogia olivacea Robyns
 Fadogia parvifolia Verdc.
 Fadogia pobeguinii Pobég.
 Fadogia punctulata Robyns
 Fadogia rostrata Robyns
 Fadogia salictaria S.Moore
 Fadogia schmitzii Verdc.
 Fadogia spectabilis Milne-Redh.
 Fadogia stenophylla Welw. ex Hiern
 Fadogia tetraquetra K.Schum. & K.Krause
 Fadogia tomentosa De Wild.
 Fadogia triphylla Baker
 Fadogia variifolia Robyns
 Fadogia verdcourtii Tennant
 Fadogia verdickii De Wild. & T.Durand
 Fadogia vollesenii Verdc.

References

External links

World Checklist of Rubiaceae

 
Rubiaceae genera